Gordon Douglas Brickner (December 15, 1907 – September 29, 1993) was an American film director and actor, who directed many different genres of films over the course of a five-decade career in motion pictures.

Early life
Born Gordon Douglas Brickner in New York City, he began his career as a child actor, appearing in some films directed by Maurice Costello.  He also worked at MGM as a book-keeper.

Career

Hal Roach and Our Gang
As a teenager, Douglas got a job at the Hal Roach Studios, working in the office and appearing in bit parts in various Hal Roach films. He made walk-on appearances in at least three Our Gang shorts: Teacher's Pet (1930), Big Ears (1931) and Birthday Blues (1932).

By 1934, Douglas was assistant to director Gus Meins and served as assistant director on Stan Laurel and Oliver Hardy's 1934 film Babes in Toyland and on the Our Gang comedies made between 1934 and mid-1936.

Beginning with Bored of Education in 1936, Our Gang moved from two-reel (20-minute) comedies to one-reel (10-minute) comedies, and Douglas became the senior director of the series. Bored of Education won the 1936 Academy Award for Live Action Short Film, and was the only Our Gang entry ever honored with the award. Douglas remained with the series as director for two years.

His Our Gang shorts, featuring Spanky, Alfalfa, Darla, Porky, Buckwheat, Waldo, Butch and Woim, are the most familiar in the series’ 22-year canon.

Douglas worked on the Our Gang feature General Spanky (1936). His shorts included Spooky Hooky (1936) and Pay as You Exit (1936).

Roach sold the Our Gang unit to Metro-Goldwyn-Mayer in May 1938. Douglas directed two MGM Our Gangs on loan from Roach, The Little Ranger (1938) and Aladdin's Lantern (1938) before deciding that he could not get used to the more industrialized atmosphere at the larger studio.

Returning to his home studio, Douglas directed the feature Zenobia (1939) with Oliver Hardy teamed with Harry Langdon instead of Stan Laurel; it was a box office disappointment. Laurel and Hardy were reunited for Douglas' next film, Saps at Sea (1940) (Laurel and Hardy's last film produced by the Hal Roach Studio) which was followed by All-American Co-Ed with former Our Gang member Johnny Downs (and Langdon).

Douglas next helmed Niagara Falls (1941), one of Hal Roach's Streamliners, a series of short features less than 50 minutes, and he co-wrote and directed Roach’s’’ feature Broadway Limited (1941) and provided the story for Topper Returns (1941). His last effort for Roach was the featurette The Devil with Hitler (1942). He might have stayed with Roach indefinitely, but Roach turned his studio over to the U.S. Army for the production of wartime training films.

RKO Films
Douglas moved over to RKO Pictures. He made a series of low budget comedies including The Great Gildersleeve (1942), based on the radio show; and its sequel Gildersleeve on Broadway (1943), Gildersleeve's Bad Day (1943) and Gildersleeve's Ghost (1944). He also helmed The Falcon in Hollywood (1944), Girl Rush (1944), A Night of Adventure (1944) and First Yank into Tokyo (1945).

He made Zombies on Broadway (1945) with the comedy team of Brown and Carney, then San Quentin (1946), Dick Tracy vs. Cueball (1946) and If You Knew Susie (1948).

Columbia Films
In 1948, Douglas migrated from RKO to producer Edward Small who had a releasing deal with Columbia Pictures. For Small, he made Walk a Crooked Mile (1948) and The Black Arrow (1948).

Columbia used Douglas on Mr. Soft Touch (1949), Between Midnight and Dawn (1950), Rogues of Sherwood Forest (1950), Fortunes of Captain Blood (1950) and The Nevadan (1950). They loaned him to British Lion to make State Secret (1950) in England.

Cagney Productions and Warner Bros.
James Cagney was making a film for Warner Bros., Kiss Tomorrow Goodbye (1950) with his brother William, and they hired Douglas to direct. Douglas signed long-term deals with Cagney Productions and Warners.

In May 1950, Douglas signed a non exclusive two-picture deal with Paramount. The first of these was The Great Missouri Raid (1951). He was meant to make a second film for Paramount but they released him so Cagney could use him again on Only the Valiant (1951) a Western with Gregory Peck.

Douglas went on to establish himself as one of Warners' leading directors of the 1950s, working in all genres: I Was a Communist for the FBI (1951); Come Fill the Cup (1951), produced by Cagney starring James Cagney; The Iron Mistress (1952) a biopic of Jim Bowie starring Alan Ladd; Mara Maru (1952), an adventure story with Errol Flynn; So This Is Love (1953), a musical biopic of Grace Moore; The Charge at Feather River (1954), a 3D Western; She's Back on Broadway (1953), a musical; Them! (1954), a science fiction film about giant ants; Young at Heart (1955), with Doris Day and Frank Sinatra; Sincerely Yours (1955) with Liberace; The McConnell Story (1955), a biopic of Joseph C. McConnell with Alan Ladd; Santiago (1956) with Ladd; Bombers B-52 (1957) and The Big Land (1957), a Western with Ladd.

His three low-budget westerns starring Clint Walker – Fort Dobbs (1958), Yellowstone Kelly (1959) and Gold of the Seven Saints (1961, from a screenplay by Leigh Brackett originally commissioned by Howard Hawks) – have been compared to Budd Boetticher's contemporary minimalist westerns with Randolph Scott.

He did The Fiend Who Walked the West (1958) at 20th Century Fox and Up Periscope (1959) for Warners.

He had a hit with Claudelle Inglish (1961) and The Sins of Rachel Cade (1961).

Freelance director
Douglas directed Elvis Presley in the comedy Follow That Dream (1962) made for Mirisch Productions and did  Bob Hope's Call Me Bwana (1963) for Eon Productions.

He did a Western at Fox Rio Conchos (1964) then made the heist comedy Robin and the 7 Hoods (1964) for Frank Sinatra's company, starring Sinatra.

Douglas made two films starring Carroll Baker, Harlow (1965) and Sylvia (1965).

20th Century Fox
For 20th Century Fox Douglas directed Jerry Lewis in the science fiction spoof Way...Way Out (1966), did the remake of Stagecoach (1966) and made In Like Flint (1967) with James Coburn.

Douglas made Tony Rome (1967) with Sinatra at Fox, and the Western Chuka (1967) for star-producer Rod Taylor at Paramount.  There were two more with Sinatra at Fox, The Detective (1968) and a sequel to Tony Rome, Lady in Cement (1968).

Later career
After the Western Barquero (1970), Douglas did Skullduggery (1970) and directed Sidney Poitier's They Call Me Mister Tibbs! (1970) for the Mirisches. He did some uncredited directing on Skin Game (1971).

Slaughter's Big Rip-Off (1973) was a blaxploitation film and Nevada Smith (1975).

Douglas returned to Warner Bros. for his final film, 1977's Viva Knievel!, in which the stuntman Evel Knievel played himself in a fanciful biography.

Reportedly, Douglas was the only person to ever direct both Elvis and Sinatra on film.

Attempting to explain his prodigious directorial output, Douglas told Bertrand Tavernier, "I have a large family to feed, and it's only occasionally that I find a story that interests me".

Death
Douglas died of cancer at the age of 85 on September 29, 1993, in Los Angeles. He was survived by his wife, Julia Mack, and two children.

Filmography

Director

 The Infernal Triangle (1935)
 Lucky Beginners (1935, short)
 General Spanky (1936)
 Spooky Hooky (1936, short)
 Pay As You Exit (1936, short)
 Two Too Young (1936, short)
 Bored of Education (1936, short)
 The Pigskin Palooka (1937, short)
 Framing Youth (1937, short)
 Fishy Tales (1937, short)
 Night 'n' Gales (1937, short)
 Roamin' Holiday (1937, short)
 Three Smart Boys (1937, short)
 Rushin' Ballet (1937, short)
 Hearts Are Thumps (1937, short)
 Glove Taps (1937, short)
 Our Gang Follies of 1938 (1937, short)
 Reunion in Rhythm (1937, short) (also titled Our Gang Follies in 1937)
 Aladdin's Lantern (1938, short)
 The Little Ranger (1938, short)
 Hide and Shriek (1938, short)
 Feed 'em and Weep (1938, short)
 Came the Brawn (1938, short)
 Bear Facts (1938, short)
 Canned Fishing (1938, short)
 Zenobia (1939) (also titled Elephants Never Forget)
 Saps at Sea (1940)
 Niagara Falls (1941)
 Broadway Limited (1941)
 The Great Gildersleeve (1942)
 The Devil with Hitler (1942)
 Gildersleeve on Broadway (1943)
 Gildersleeve's Bad Day (1943)
 The Falcon in Hollywood (1944)
 Girl Rush (1944)
 Gildersleeve's Ghost (1944)
 A Night of Adventure (1944)
 First Yank into Tokyo (1945) (also titled Mask of Fury)
 Zombies on Broadway (1945)
 San Quentin (1946)
 Dick Tracy vs. Cueball (1946)
 Walk a Crooked Mile (1948)
 The Black Arrow (1948)
 If You Knew Susie (1948)
 Mr. Soft Touch (1949)
 The Great Manhunt (1949)
 The Doolins of Oklahoma (1949)
 Between Midnight and Dawn (1950)
 Kiss Tomorrow Goodbye (1950)
 Rogues of Sherwood Forest (1950)
 Fortunes of Captain Blood (1950)
 The Nevadan (1950)
 The Great Missouri Raid (1951)
 Come Fill the Cup (1951)
 I Was a Communist for the FBI (1951)
 Only the Valiant (1951)
 The Iron Mistress (1952)
 Mara Maru (1952)
 So This Is Love (1953) (also titled The Grace Moore Story)
 The Charge at Feather River (1953)
 She's Back on Broadway (1953)
 Young at Heart (1954)
 Them! (1954)
 Sincerely Yours (1955)
 The McConnell Story (1955)
 Santiago (1956)
 Bombers B-52 (1957)
 Stampeded (1957)
 No Sleep Til Dawn (1957)
 The Big Land (1957)
 The Fiend Who Walked the West (1958)
 Fort Dobbs (1958)
 Yellowstone Kelly (1959)
 Up Periscope (1959)
 The Miracle (1959) (battle scenes)
 Claudelle Inglish (1961) (also titled Young and Eager)
 Gold of the Seven Saints (1961)
 The Sins of Rachel Cade (1961)
 Follow that Dream (1962)
 Call Me Bwana (1963)
 Rio Conchos (1964)
 Robin and the 7 Hoods (1964)
 Sylvia (1965)
 Harlow (1965)
 Way...Way Out (1966)
 Stagecoach (1966)
 Tony Rome (1967)
 Chuka (1967)
 In Like Flint (1967)
 The Detective (1968)
 Lady in Cement (1968)
 Barquero (1970)
 They Call Me Mister Tibbs! (1970)
 Skullduggery (1970)
 Skin Game (1971) (uncredited)
 Slaughter's Big Rip-Off (1973)
 Nevada Smith (1975)
 Viva Knievel! (1977)

Actor (selected)
 Pardon Us (1931) – Typist (uncredited)
 One Good Turn (1931) - Community Player (uncredited)
 The Mystery of Edwin Drood (1935) – Coroner (uncredited)

References

External links

 
 

1907 births
1993 deaths
Male actors from New York City
American male child actors
American male film actors
American film directors
Deaths from cancer in California
Hal Roach Studios filmmakers
Burials at Forest Lawn Memorial Park (Glendale)
20th-century American male actors
Our Gang
Film producers from New York (state)